Milorad Nikolić (born 6 February 1984) is a Serbian professional footballer who plays as a goalkeeper.

During his journeyman career, Nikolić played for numerous clubs in his country and abroad, probably best remembered for his stint at Sevojno.

Honours
Sevojno
 Serbian Cup: Runner-up 2008–09

References

External links
 
 
 

Association football goalkeepers
Expatriate footballers in Bosnia and Herzegovina
Expatriate footballers in Slovakia
FK Beograd players
FK Bežanija players
FK Budućnost Dobanovci players
FK Crvenka players
FK Javor Ivanjica players
FK Mladost Apatin players
FK Mladost Velika Obarska players
FK Napredak Kruševac players
FK Sevojno players
FK Sinđelić Beograd players
FK Sloboda Užice players
FK Sloga Požega players
FK Zemun players
MFK Ružomberok players
Premier League of Bosnia and Herzegovina players
Serbian expatriate footballers
Serbian expatriate sportspeople in Bosnia and Herzegovina
Serbian expatriate sportspeople in Slovakia
Serbian First League players
Serbian footballers
Serbian SuperLiga players
Slovak Super Liga players
Footballers from Belgrade
1984 births
Living people